KWGF 101.7 FM is a radio station licensed to Vaughn, Montana.  The station broadcasts a Hot AC format and is owned by Staradio Corp.

References

External links
KWGF's official website

WGF
Hot adult contemporary radio stations in the United States